Green's Harbour is a local service district and designated place in the Canadian province of Newfoundland and Labrador.

Geography 
Green's Harbour is in Newfoundland within Subdivision E of Division No. 1.

Demographics 

Government 
Green's Harbour is a local service district (LSD) that is governed by a committee responsible for the provision of certain services to the community. The chair of the LSD committee is Jennifer Hillier.

Heart and Hand Loyal Orange Lodge #9 
The Heart and Hand Loyal Orange Lodge #9 was designated as a Registered Heritage Structure by the Heritage Foundation of Newfoundland and Labrador in 1995.  The building was listed on the Canadian Register of Historic Places on 2005/01/26. As a fundraiser for the building's restoration work in 2018, the Green's Harbour Heritage Society sold wooden shingles which the town's residents decorated on the reverse with personalized messages and memories, serving as a type of time capsule.

See also 
List of designated places in Newfoundland and Labrador
List of local service districts in Newfoundland and Labrador
Newfoundland and Labrador Route 80

References 

Designated places in Newfoundland and Labrador
Local service districts in Newfoundland and Labrador